Elena Terekhova is a former Russian international footballer who played for CSKA Moscow in the Russian Championship. She also played for Ryazan-VDV, Energiya Voronezh, Spartak Moscow, Rossiyanka Krasnoarmeysk and W-League's FC Indiana. Terekhova is a midfielder, but she can also play as a striker.

She has won two Russian league, three Russian cup, the 2007 W-League and the 2005 UEFA U19 Euro, where she scored the first goal in the final against France.

Titles

National teams
 UEFA U-19 European Championship (1): 2005

Clubs
 Russian Championship (2): 2013, 2016
 Russian Cup (3): 2008, 2009, 2014
 USL W-League (1): 2007

Official international goals

References

1987 births
Living people
Russian women's footballers
People from Voronezh
Russia women's international footballers
Expatriate women's soccer players in the United States
WFC Rossiyanka players
FC Energy Voronezh players
Ryazan-VDV players
Women's association football midfielders
Russian expatriate sportspeople in the United States
F.C. Indiana players
Universiade silver medalists for Russia
Universiade medalists in football
ZFK CSKA Moscow players
Russian expatriate footballers
Russian Women's Football Championship players